Murray A. Lightburn is a Canadian musician, best known as the lead vocalist and principal songwriter for The Dears.

Lightburn has been called "the black Morrissey" due to his vocal similarity (and shared penchant for somewhat dark lyrics) to the former The Smiths lead singer. Incidentally, The Dears toured as Morrissey's opening act during Morrissey's solo tour in 2006.

In 2013 he released the solo album Mass: Light. His second solo album, Hear Me Out, was released in 2019.

Discography

Studio albums
 2013 - Murray A. Lightburn's MASS:LIGHT
 2019 - Hear Me Out
 2023 - Once Upon A Time in Montréal

Singles
 2018 Belleville Blues

Personal life
In 2005, Lightburn married fellow band member, keyboardist/singer Natalia Yanchak. They have two children named Neptune and Apollo Lightburn.

References

Year of birth missing (living people)
Living people
21st-century Black Canadian male singers
Canadian rock singers
Canadian songwriters
Canadian indie rock musicians